Sherborne Town Football Club are a football club based in the town of Sherborne, Dorset, England. The club is affiliated to the Dorset County Football Association and is a FA chartered Standard club.

History
The club was founded in 1894 and played their matches at Marston Road. Just before the Second World War the club moved to the Terrace playing fields. The club then moved grounds again in 1985 to their present home of Raleigh Grove, referencing Sir Walter Raleigh's historical connection with the town.

In 1962, they joined the Dorset Combination. In the 1986–87 season the club entered the FA Vase for the first time and stayed in the competition until the end of the 1996–97 season, when their ground was deemed not fit for the competition as it had no floodlights. In the season 2003-4 the club had improved its facilities off the pitch, with floodlights and a 150-seater stand being installed. They also finished fourth in the league that season and won the Dorset Senior County Cup. An application was made to join the Western League but the Dorset Premier League refused to grant consent.

The 2005–06 campaign saw the club able to re-enter the FA Vase again. At the end of the season they finished second in the Dorset Premier Football League and this time gained promotion to the Western League Division One. After finishing 4th in 2006–07, they finished runners-up in 2007–08 – gaining promotion to the Western League Premier Division. That season also saw the club make its debut in the FA Cup, however it was very short-lived after a 4–1 loss away to Liskeard Athletic in the Extra Preliminary round.

The club remained in the Premier Division until the end of the 2011–12 season, when they finished second from bottom, forcing them to be relegated back to Division one. The club bounced back up to the Premier Division at the first attempt when they finished as Champions of Division one.

Ground

Sherborne Town play their home games at Raleigh Grove, Terrace Playing Fields, Sherborne, DT9 5NS.

The Raleigh Grove site was built on a grazing field with a pond in the far right corner of the ground. When the ground was built the club made sure it followed the regulations laid down for promotion from the Dorset Premier League at the time, meaning a covered section on the south west side of the ground was erected for supporters. The pitch also had four drains laid to aid the playing surface.

Planning permission was granted in 2003 for further work to be done to the ground and in 2004 hard standing, a grandstand, new dugouts and floodlights were all erected and working in just three months.

The record attendance at the ground is 1,000 versus Eastleigh (featuring ex-Southampton and England international Matthew Le Tissier), in the Andy Shephard Memorial match on 27 July 2003. Four Football League clubs have played at Raleigh Grove: Plymouth Argyle, Torquay United, Swindon Town and Yeovil Town.

Current squad

Honours

League honours
Western League Division One:
Champions (2): 2012-13, 2021–22
Runners-up (1): 2007–08
Dorset Combination/Premier:
Champions (1): 1981–82
Runners-up (3): 1992–93, 2001–02, 2005–06

Cup honours
Dorset Senior Cup:
Winners (2): 2003–04, 2007–08 
Runners-up (1): 2006–07

Club records

Highest League Position: 9th in Western League premier Division 2013-14
FA Cup best performance: Second qualifying round 2010–11
FA Vase best performance: Fourth round 2006–07
Highest Attendance: 1,000 vs Eastleigh 27 July 2003

Former players
1. Players that have played/managed in the football league or any foreign equivalent to this level (i.e. fully professional league).
2. Players with full international caps.
Chris Giles

References

External links
Official Website

Western Football League
Football clubs in Dorset
1894 establishments in England
Association football clubs established in 1894
Sherborne
Football clubs in England